The Battle of El Sauce, or the Battle of Punta de Rieles or Punta Rieles, took place on the 26 December 1932 during the American occupation of Nicaragua of 1926–1933. It was the last major battle of the Sandino Rebellion of 1927–1933. The incident has its origins in Nicaraguan President José María Moncada's plan to commemorate the completion of the León-El Sauce railway on the 28 December 1932. 

Rumors spread that Sandinista rebels planned on crashing the ceremony, so an expedition of eight Marines and 64 Nicaraguan National Guardsmen led by Captain Lewis B. "Chesty" Puller were sent by train towards El Sauce on the 26 December 1932 to secure the area. A Sandinista force led by Juan Pablo Umanzor, meanwhile, was looting a construction company commissary. As the Marines'/National Guard's train passed some ancient ruins, it was fired upon by rebels from both sides of the tracks.

Soldiers led by Puller exited the train on the right side, while those following First Lieutenant William A. Lee got out on the left side of the tracks. Lee's men soon took cover in a ditch, while Puller's forces "tried to turn Umanzor's left flank." During the firefight, Corporal Bennie M. Bunn grabbed a Browning automatic rifle and began driving the Sandinistas back. The battle concluded, after one hour and ten minutes, in a victory for the Marines and National Guard. Thirty-one Sandinista corpses were found after the battle (and 63 live horses were captured), compared to losses of three killed and three wounded for the Guard.

Moncada got to participate in ceremony two days later, as planned. He was so pleased with American performance during the battle that he promoted Puller to major and Lee to captain.

References

History of Nicaragua
El Sauce
El Sauce
El Sauce
El Sauce
1932 in Nicaragua
December 1932 events